The Warrior Empress (Italian: Saffo - Venere di Lesbo) is a 1960 Italian-French peplum film directed by Pietro Francisci and starring Kerwin Mathews, Tina Louise and Riccardo Garrone.

Cast

References

Bibliography 
 Gary Allen Smith. Epic Films: Casts, Credits and Commentary on More Than 350 Historical Spectacle Movies. McFarland, 2004.

External links 
 

French historical adventure films
Italian historical adventure films
1960s historical adventure films
1960 films
1960s Italian-language films
Films directed by Pietro Francisci
Peplum films
Cultural depictions of Sappho
Films with screenplays by Luciano Martino
Films scored by Angelo Francesco Lavagnino
Sword and sandal films
1960s Italian films
1960s French films